Suffolk is a county in England.

Suffolk may also refer to:

Animals
 Suffolk sheep, black-faced, open-faced breed of domestic sheep 
 Suffolk Punch, one of England's oldest breeds of draft horse

Places

Canada
Suffolk Township, now Saint-Émile-de-Suffolk, Quebec

United Kingdom
Suffolk, Belfast, in Andersonstown, Northern Ireland
Suffolk (European Parliament constituency)
Suffolk (UK Parliament constituency)
East Suffolk (disambiguation)
Mid Suffolk, a local government district
Suffolk Coastal, a former local government district 
West Suffolk (disambiguation)

United States
Suffolk, Mississippi, in Franklin County, Mississippi
Suffolk, Montana, in Fergus County, Montana
Suffolk, Virginia, an independent city in eastern Virginia
Suffolk County, Massachusetts
Suffolk County, New York

Ships
 Suffolk (ship), several ships
 HMS Suffolk, one of five ships, so named, of the British Royal Navy
 USS Suffolk (AKA-69), an attack cargo ship of the United States Navy

Other uses
 Earl of Suffolk, a title that has been created four times in the Peerage of England
 Duke of Suffolk, a title that has been created three times in the Peerage of England
 Suffolk Downs, a thoroughbred race track in East Boston, Massachusetts
 Suffolk University, a college in Boston, MA

See also
 New Suffolk, New York
 Suffolk House (disambiguation)